Coptoglossus is a genus of beetles in the family Carabidae, containing the following species:

 Coptoglossus carteri (Sloane, 1915)
 Coptoglossus sulcatulus Chaudoir, 1869

References

Platyninae